"Tithonus" is the tenth episode of the sixth season of the American science fiction television series The X-Files. It premiered on the Fox network on January 24, 1999. The episode was written by Vince Gilligan, and directed by Michael W. Watkins. The episode is a "Monster-of-the-Week" story, unconnected to the series' wider mythology. "Tithonus" earned a Nielsen household rating of 9.2, being watched by 15.90 million people in its initial broadcast. The episode received positive reviews.

The show centers on FBI special agents Fox Mulder (David Duchovny) and Dana Scully (Gillian Anderson) who work on cases linked to the paranormal, called X-Files. Mulder is a believer in the paranormal, while the skeptical Scully has been assigned to debunk his work. In this episode, Scully learns that she, but not Mulder, is being given a chance to prove her worth at the FBI, and—paired with a new partner—she investigates a crime scene photographer with an uncanny knack for arriving just in time to see his victims' final moments. What she does not expect, however, is for Death to play a role himself.

Vince Gilligan wrote "Tithonus" in an attempt to create a story wherein immortality is portrayed as scary. The episode was based on three different stories: Arthur Fellig, the Greek myth of Tithonus, and the yellow fever epidemic in the 19th century. In addition, several of the scenes were filmed on the sets from NYPD Blue, whose sets were located just across from The X-Files studios. The character of Alfred Fellig in "Tithonus" has thematically been compared to the Tithonus in Alfred, Lord Tennyson's dramatic monologue of the same name. In addition, themes of immortality and escaping death were revisited in the eighth season episode "The Gift".

Plot
In New York City, a man with a camera follows a woman from an elevator through a corridor to another elevator, where all the people appear to be gray. He gets off on a floor before the woman and runs down the stairs. Lights flicker and the elevator cable snaps. As the man reaches the basement, the cab crashes and its door spills open to reveal the woman's wrist, covered with blood. The man begins to snap photos. Later, in Washington, D.C., FBI Assistant Director Alvin Kersh (James Pickens, Jr.) assigns Dana Scully (Gillian Anderson), along with Agent Peyton Ritter from New York, to the case. Scully's partner Fox Mulder (David Duchovny) looks at the material on Scully's desk and points out that the case looks like an X-file—and that Kersh is obviously splitting them up.

Scully and Ritter soon discover that their prime suspect, Alfred Fellig, who has worked as a police photographer since 1964, has not aged at all in any of his official photos on his renewal applications. Elsewhere in the city, Fellig watches a criminal kill a youth for his sneakers. When he approaches to take photos of the dying young man, the murderer returns and repeatedly stabs Fellig, but he pulls the knife out of his back and walks away. Scully and Ritter learn of the crime and of the fact that Fellig's prints are on the knife. Ritter demands to know how Fellig always seems to be around when people die, but Scully realizes that the man is in pain and asks whether he was wounded in the attack which Fellig says he merely observed. When she sees the wounds on his back she sends him to the hospital, much to Ritter's chagrin. Ritter reminds Scully that they are trying to charge Fellig with murder, and to not let him go.

Ritter leaves Scully staking out Fellig's apartment, but Scully is unnerved when she sees Fellig shooting photos of her out his window and bangs on his door, demanding to know how he took photos at a crime scene before the police even knew the crime had been committed. He invites her to take a ride with him so he can show her. After driving, he sees a prostitute who appears to be gray to him. Fellig tells Scully that the woman will be dead very soon. A pimp approaches the woman and begins to harass her. Scully leaps out of the car with her gun, announcing that she is an FBI agent and handcuffing the pimp, but when the prostitute tries to flee, she is hit by a truck and killed.

Scully goes to warn Fellig that he is about to be charged for murder, and accuses him of profiting from people's deaths. In his darkroom, Fellig shows Scully a photo of a dead woman with an odd fuzzy shape around her head, which the photographer claims is Death. When asked why he bothers to try to photograph Death, Fellig says that it is so he can look Death in the face and finally die. He claims to be 149 years old, and says he cannot kill himself. Scully points out that most people would like to live forever, but Fellig says that he has experienced everything, and that even love does not last forever. Suddenly, he notices that Scully is gray, and says, "Count your blessings." When she asks about the science of his immortality, he says he was meant to die of yellow fever, but he refused to look Death in the face, so instead Death took the kind nurse who had taken care of him.  Fellig takes a photo just as Ritter enters and shoots. The bullet passes right through the camera and through Fellig into Scully, who collapses. While Ritter rushes to call an ambulance, Fellig asks Scully whether she saw Death and begs her to close her eyes. He covers her hand with his own. The color returns to Scully's hand as Fellig's turns gray. Looking up, he dies.

At the hospital, Mulder watches through a window as Ritter apologizes to Scully, then tells Ritter that he's a lucky man (because Scully survived). Going inside the room, Mulder reports to Scully that Fellig died of a single gunshot wound, while the doctors are amazed at her own rapid recovery.

Production

Writing

An X-Files story about immortality had been discussed by the writers for a number of years, but they always struggled with making the concept "scary". Frank Spotnitz, the show's executive producer, claimed that the breakthrough came when they began contemplating the idea of an immortal photographer trying to catch Death so that he could die. Vince Gilligan was assigned to outline and write "Tithonus", and he took inspiration from three distinct aspects of history and myth. The first of these was the story of Arthur "Weegee" Fellig, a famous photographer, whose name served as the inspiration for Alfred Fellig. The second was the New York Yellow fever epidemic in the 19th century. The third and most fantastical inspiration was the Greek myth of Tithonus (to which this episode's title alludes), who was the son of Cephalus and the lover of Eos, Goddess of the Dawn. Eos later kidnapped him to be her lover and asked Zeus to make him immortal. Eos, however, forgot to ask for eternal youth to go with eternal life, resulting in Tithonus living forever but degenerating into a husk of a man.

The episode was not the first X-Files episode to reference to immortality. The season three episode "Clyde Bruckman's Final Repose" featured Scully being told by the titular character that she would not die. This episode was the inception of a lesser-known story arc that was originally supposed to reveal that Scully was immortal. The sub-plot, popular with fans on the internet, was verified by Spotnitz. However, Spotnitz later admitted that this sub-plot was bookended by "Tithonus", a solution that Spotnitz later called "very satisfying".

Filming and effects
While the first five seasons of the series were mainly filmed in Vancouver, British Columbia, production of the show's sixth season was based in Los Angeles, California. Several of the scenes for "Tithonus" were shot on the sound stage of NYPD Blue, an ABC program whose sets were just across from the Fox studios.

All of Fellig's cameras were borrowed from the University of California's Museum of Photography, and many of the photographs were used courtesy of the Los Angeles-based advertising and licensing agency Corbis. The production staff of The X-Files was tasked with not only creating the photographs that Fellig takes, but also with ensuring that each looked as if it belonged to a discrete time period. Tom Day, the episode's property master, researched "popular government typefaces and printing technologies" to make the pictures as historically accurate as possible.

The episode featured several special effects. The stab wounds that were on Fellig's back were constructed in "precisely graduated sizes" to show Fellig's healing powers. The faux-wounds were then applied to Lewis' back by make-up department head Cheri Montesanto-Mecalf. Reportedly the effect that caused the most headaches was turning select figures in photos black-and-white. Visual effects producer Bill Millar noted that the process was "very similar to the one used to wreck all those old movies by colorizing them. In fact, it's basically the same, only in reverse". The "painstaking" process involved outlining what needed to be de-colorized. A computer program then completed the job. Millar had previously used the technique on the NBC series Nightmare Cafe in 1992 as well as the 1998 movie Pleasantville.

Themes

Besides a direct reference to the titular mythological character, Matthew VanWinkle, in the chapter "Tennyson's 'Tithonus' and the Exhaustion of Survival in The X-Files", of the book The X-Files and Literature: Unweaving the Story, Unraveling the Lie to Find the Truth, argues that the episode bears a striking resemblance to Alfred, Lord Tennyson's dramatic monologue "Tithonus". In the poem, one line reads "Alas! For this gray shadow, once a man." VanWinkle argues that in The X-Files episode, this line is paralleled by Alfred Fellig's tendency to see those about to die in a monochromatic vision. Furthermore, both the poem and the episode stress that death is not appealing because it is simply "a means to an end". Rather, it is to be sought because it "is the event that most fully unites us with other humans."

VanWinkle compared and contrasted Fellig with Eugene Victor Tooms, from the first season episodes "Squeeze" and "Tooms", and John Barnett, from the first season entry "Young at Heart". While all three are similar in that they have obtained, to a varying degree, elements of immortality, Tooms is different from Fellig because he is a "monstrous predator", and Barnett is unlike Fellig because he is a mere sociopath. Fellig, however, is the only character, out of the three, to possess true immortality. Furthermore, he is separated from Tooms and Barnett due to his distinct hatred for his ability; he did not want to be immortal; rather, it was forced upon him. VanWinkle also notes that Fellig is, furthermore, different from Tennyson's Tithonus because the latter actively sought immortality, due to the flaw of hubris or extreme pride, in order to become more like a god.

In the episode, VanWinkle draws parallels between Scully and Tithonus' lover Aurora. In the end, both will "continue [their] ending and invariable office"—in the former's case, investigating crimes, and in the latter's case, raising the dawn. The themes of immortality and escaping death were later revisited in the eight season episode "The Gift". In the episode, Agent John Doggett, played by Robert Patrick, is looking for clues following Mulder's abduction. Without Scully, he travels to Pennsylvania and seeks out a soul eater: a being that can consume another person's injuries. In the end, Doggett is fatally shot, and the soul eater, wishing to die, consumes Doggett's death. VanWinkle argues that this episode serves as a direct parallel to "Tithonus", although it switches the perspective significantly.

Broadcast and reception
"Tithonus" first aired in the United States on January 24, 1999. This episode earned a Nielsen rating of 9.2, with a 13 share, meaning that roughly 9.2 percent of all television-equipped households, and 13 percent of households watching television, were tuned in to the episode. It was viewed by 15.90 million viewers. The episode aired in the United Kingdom and Ireland on Sky1 on May 9, 1999, and received 0.79 million viewers, making it the third most watched episode that week. Fox promoted the episode with the tagline "When death looks you in the face... you're dead. Tonight, Scully gets a good hard look."

The episode was met with largely positive reviews. Zack Handlen of The A.V. Club wrote positively of the episode and awarded it an "A" grade. He noted the entries' similarities with "Clyde Bruckman's Final Repose", noting that both deal with men "who [know] too much about death for [their] own good". He also praised the characterization of Scully and Fellig; he noted that the former is "no-nonsense" and optimistic, whereas the latter is a "creepy man" who is jealous of those who are capable of dying. Handlen concluded that the episode "doesn’t play out like a classic monster episode, it feels like one". Tom Kessenich, in his book Examination: An Unauthorized Look at Seasons 6–9 of the X-Files wrote positively of the episode, comparing it favorably to "Clyde Bruckman's Final Repose". He wrote, "If imitation is the highest form of flattery, what is a fascinating offshoot of a previous incarnation? I'd say it looks a lot like the latest entry into Season 6 of The X-Files. The engaging 'Tithonus'."

Robert Shearman and Lars Pearson, in their book Wanting to Believe: A Critical Guide to The X-Files, Millennium & The Lone Gunmen, rated the episode five stars out of five, drawing comparisons to "Clyde Bruckman's Final Repose", but noting that the former has "a flavour all of its own". Shearman and Pearson praised Geoffrey Lewis' portrayal of Fellig, and described "Tithonus" as "bizarre, chilling, and yet strangely life-affirming". Paula Vitaris from Cinefantastique gave the episode a mixed-to-positive review and awarded it two-and-a-half stars out of four. Vitaris wrote that the episode had a "terrific 'feel'". In addition, Vitaris, despite slightly criticizing Gillian Anderson's "tired" performance through most of the episode, called Anderson's acting in the scene wherein Scully is shot "excellent", citing her "amazement and near-paralysis" as reasons why the scene was a success. The character of Alfred Fellig has also attracted positive critical acclaim. UGO Networks listed him amongst the greatest monster-of-the-week characters in The X-Files.

Footnotes

Bibliography

External links

 

The X-Files (season 6) episodes
1999 American television episodes
Television episodes written by Vince Gilligan
Television episodes about personifications of death
Television episodes set in New York City
Fiction about photography